The El Collado Formation is a geological formation in Cuenca, Spain whose strata date back to the Early Cretaceous. Dinosaur remains are among the fossils that have been recovered from the formation.

Fossil content 
 Theropod indet 
 Sauropod (=Camarasauridae indet.)

Correlation

See also 
 List of dinosaur-bearing rock formations

References 

Geologic formations of Spain
Lower Cretaceous Series of Europe
Cretaceous Spain
Barremian Stage
Limestone formations
Shale formations
Mudstone formations
Sandstone formations
Conglomerate formations
Deltaic deposits
Fluvial deposits
Lacustrine deposits
Paleontology in Spain
Formations
Formations
Formations